The Etruscan civilization was developed by a people of Etruria in ancient Italy with a common language and culture who formed a federation of city-states. After conquering adjacent lands, its territory covered, at its greatest extent, roughly what is now Tuscany, western Umbria, and northern Lazio, as well as what are now the Po Valley, Emilia-Romagna, south-eastern Lombardy, southern Veneto, and western Campania.

The earliest evidence of a culture that is identifiably Etruscan dates from about 900BC. This is the period of the Iron Age Villanovan culture, considered to be the earliest phase of Etruscan civilization, which itself developed from the previous late Bronze Age Proto-Villanovan culture in the same region. Etruscan civilization endured until it was assimilated into Roman society. Assimilation began in the late 4thcenturyBC as a result of the Roman–Etruscan Wars; it accelerated with the grant of Roman citizenship in 90 BC, and became complete in 27 BC, when the Etruscans' territory was incorporated into the newly established Roman Empire.

The territorial extent of Etruscan civilization reached its maximum around 750 BC, during the foundational period of the Roman Kingdom. Its culture flourished in three confederacies of cities: that of Etruria (Tuscany, Latium and Umbria), that of the Po Valley with the eastern Alps, and that of Campania. The league in northern Italy is mentioned in Livy. The reduction in Etruscan territory was gradual, but after 500BC, the political balance of power on the Italian peninsula shifted away from the Etruscans in favor of the rising Roman Republic.

The earliest known examples of Etruscan writing are inscriptions found in southern Etruria that date to around 700BC. The Etruscans developed a system of writing derived from the Euboean alphabet, which was used in the Magna Graecia (coastal areas located in Southern Italy). The Etruscan language remains only partly understood, making modern understanding of their society and culture heavily dependent on much later and generally disapproving Roman and Greek sources. In the Etruscan political system, authority resided in its individual small cities, and probably in its prominent individual families. At the height of Etruscan power, elite Etruscan families grew very rich through trade with the Celtic world to the north and the Greeks to the south, and they filled their large family tombs with imported luxuries.

Legend and history

Ethnonym and etymology
The Etruscans called themselves Rasenna, which was shortened to Rasna or Raśna (Neo-Etruscan), with both etymologies unknown.

In Attic Greek, the Etruscans were known as Tyrrhenians (Tyrrhēnoi, earlier  Tyrsēnoi), from which the Romans derived the names Tyrrhēnī, Tyrrhēnia (Etruria), and Mare Tyrrhēnum (Tyrrhenian Sea), prompting some to associate them with the Teresh (one of the Sea Peoples named by the Egyptians).

The ancient Romans referred to the Etruscans as the Tuscī or Etruscī (singular Tuscus). Their Roman name is the origin of the terms "Toscana", which refers to their heartland, and "Etruria", which can refer to their wider region. The term Tusci is thought by linguists to have been the Umbrian word for "Etruscan", based on an inscription on an ancient bronze tablet from a nearby region. The inscription contains the phrase turskum ... nomen, literally "the Tuscan name". Based on a knowledge of Umbrian grammar, linguists can infer that the base form of the word turskum is *Tursci, which would, through metathesis and a word-initial epenthesis, be likely to lead to the form, E-trus-ci.

As for the original meaning of the root, *Turs-, a widely cited hypothesis is that it, like the word Latin turris, means "tower", and comes from the Greek word for tower: . On this hypothesis, the Tusci were called the "people who build towers" or "the tower builders". This proposed etymology is made the more plausible because the Etruscans preferred to build their towns on high precipices reinforced  by walls. Alternatively, Giuliano and Larissa Bonfante have speculated that Etruscan houses may have seemed like towers to the simple Latins. The proposed etymology has a long history, Dionysius of Halicarnassus having observed in the first century B. C., "[T]here is no reason that the Greeks should not have called [the Etruscans] by this name, both from their living in towers and from the name of one of their rulers." In his recent Etymological Dictionary of Greek, Robert Beekes claims the Greek word is a "loanword from a Mediterranean language," a hypothesis that goes back to an article by Paul Kretschmer in Glotta from 1934.

Origins

Ancient sources
Literary and historical texts in the Etruscan language have not survived, and the language itself is only partially understood by modern scholars. This makes modern understanding of their society and culture heavily dependent on much later and generally disapproving Roman and Greek sources. These ancient writers differed in their theories about the origin of the Etruscan people. Some suggested they were Pelasgians who had migrated there from Greece. Others maintained that they were indigenous to central Italy and were not from Greece.

The first Greek author to mention the Etruscans, whom the Ancient Greeks called Tyrrhenians, was the 8th-century BC poet Hesiod, in his work, the Theogony. He mentioned them as residing in central Italy alongside the Latins. The 7th-century BC Homeric Hymn to Dionysus referred to them as pirates. Unlike later Greek authors, these authors did not suggest that Etruscans had migrated to Italy from the east, and did not associate them with the Pelasgians.

It was only in the 5th century BC, when the Etruscan civilization had been established for several centuries, that Greek writers started associating the name "Tyrrhenians" with the "Pelasgians", and even then, some did so in a way that suggests they were meant only as generic, descriptive labels for "non-Greek" and "indigenous ancestors of Greeks", respectively.

The 5th-century BC historians Thucydides and Herodotus, and the 1st-century BC historian Strabo, did seem to suggest that the Tyrrhenians were originally Pelasgians who migrated to Italy from Lydia by way of the Greek island of Lemnos. They all described Lemnos as having been settled by Pelasgians, whom Thucydides identified as "belonging to the Tyrrhenians". As Strabo and Herodotus told it, the migration to Lemnos was led by Tyrrhenus / Tyrsenos, the son of Atys (who was king of Lydia). Strabo added that the Pelasgians of Lemnos and Imbros then followed Tyrrhenus to the Italian Peninsula. And, according to the logographer Hellanicus of Lesbos, there was a Pelasgian migration from Thessaly in Greece to the Italian peninsula, as part of which the Pelasgians colonized the area he called Tyrrhenia, and they then came to be called Tyrrhenians.

There is some evidence suggesting a link between the island of Lemnos and the Tyrrhenians. The Lemnos Stele bears inscriptions in a language with strong structural resemblances to the language of the Etruscans. The discovery of these inscriptions in modern times has led to the suggestion of a "Tyrrhenian language group" comprising Etruscan, Lemnian, and the Raetic spoken in the Alps.

However, the 1st-century BC historian Dionysius of Halicarnassus, a Greek living in Rome, dismissed many of the ancient theories of other Greek historians and postulated that the Etruscans were indigenous people who had always lived in Etruria and were different from both the Pelasgians and the Lydians. Dionysius noted that the 5th-century historian Xanthus of Lydia, who was originally from Sardis and was regarded as an important source and authority for the history of Lydia, never suggested a Lydian origin of the Etruscans and never named Tyrrhenus as a ruler of the Lydians.

The credibility of Dionysius of Halicarnassus is arguably bolstered by the fact that he was the first ancient writer to report the endonym of the Etruscans: Rasenna.

Similarly, the 1st-century BC historian Livy, in his Ab Urbe Condita Libri, said that the Rhaetians were Etruscans who had been driven into the mountains by the invading Gauls; and he asserted that the inhabitants of Raetia were of Etruscan origin.

First-century historian Pliny the Elder also put the Etruscans in the context of the Rhaetian people to the north, and wrote in his Natural History (AD 79):

Archeological evidence and modern etruscology

The question of Etruscan origins has long been a subject of interest and debate among historians. In modern times, all the evidence gathered so far by prehistoric and protohistoric archaeologists, anthropologists, and etruscologists points to an indigenous origin of the Etruscans. There is no archaeological or linguistic evidence of a migration of the Lydians or Pelasgians into Etruria. Modern etruscologists and archeologists, such as Massimo Pallottino (1947), have shown that early historians’ assumptions and assertions on the subject were groundless. In 2000, the etruscologist Dominique Briquel explained in detail why he believes that ancient Greek historians’ writings on Etruscan origins should not even count as historical documents. He argues that the ancient story of the Etruscans’ 'Lydian origins' was a deliberate,  politically motivated fabrication, and that ancient Greeks inferred a connection between the Tyrrhenians and the Pelasgians solely on the  basis of certain Greek and local traditions and on the mere fact that there had been trade between the Etruscans and Greeks. He noted that, even if these stories include historical facts suggesting contact, such contact is more plausibly traceable to cultural exchange than to migration.

Several archaeologists, specialised in Prehistory and Protohistory, who have analyzed Bronze Age and Iron Age remains that were excavated in the territory of historical Etruria have pointed out that no evidence has been found, related either to material culture or to social practices, that can support a migration theory. The most marked and radical change that has been archaeologically attested in the area is the adoption, starting in about the 12th century BC, of the funeral rite of incineration in terracotta urns, which is a Continental European practice, derived from the Urnfield culture; there is nothing about it that suggests an ethnic contribution from Asia Minor or the Near East. 

A 2012 survey of the previous 30 years’ archaeological findings, based on excavations of the major Etruscan cities, showed a continuity of culture from the last phase of the Bronze Age (13th–11th century BC) to the Iron Age (10th–9th century BC). This is evidence that the Etruscan civilization, which emerged around 900 BC, was built by people whose ancestors had inhabited that region for at least the previous 200 years. Based on this cultural continuity, there is now a consensus among archeologists that Proto-Etruscan culture developed, during the last phase of the Bronze Age, from the indigenous Proto-Villanovan culture, and that the subsequent Iron Age Villanovan culture is most accurately described as an  early phase of the Etruscan civilization. It is possible that there were contacts between northern-central Italy and the Mycenaean world at the end of the Bronze Age. However contacts between the inhabitants of Etruria and inhabitants of Greece, Aegean Sea Islands, Asia Minor, and the Near East are attested only centuries later, when Etruscan civilization was already flourishing and Etruscan ethnogenesis was well established. The first of these attested contacts relate to the Greek colonies in Southern Italy and Phoenician-Punic colonies in Sardinia, and the consequent orientalizing period.

One of the most common mistakes for a long time, even among some scholars of the past, has been to associate the later Orientalizing period of Etruscan civilization with the question of its origins. Orientalisation was an artistic and cultural phenomenon that spread among the Greeks themselves, and throughout much of the central and western Mediterranean, not only in Etruria. Orientalizing period in the Etruscans was due, as has been amply demonstrated by archeologists, to contacts with the Greeks and the Eastern Mediterranean and not to mass migrations. The facial features (the profile, almond-shaped eyes, large nose) in the frescoes and sculptures, and the depiction of reddish-brown men and light-skinned women, influenced by archaic Greek art, followed the artistic traditions from the Eastern Mediterranean, that had spread even among the Greeks themselves, and to a lesser extent also to other several civilizations in the central and western Mediterranean up to the Iberian Peninsula. Actually, many of the tombs of the Late Orientalizing and Archaic periods, such as the Tomb of the Augurs, the Tomb of the Triclinium or the Tomb of the Leopards, as well as other tombs from the archaic period in the Monterozzi necropolis in Tarquinia, were painted by Greek painters or, in any case, foreigner artists. These images have, therefore, a very limited value for a realistic representation of the Etruscan population. It was only from the end of the 4th century B.C. that evidence of physiognomic portraits began to be found in Etruscan art and Etruscan portraiture became more realistic.

Genetic research
An mtDNA study in 2004, based on Etruscan samples from Veneto, Tuscany, Lazio, and Campania, stated that the Etruscans had no significant heterogeneity, and that all mitochondrial lineages observed among the Etruscan samples appear typically European, but only a few haplotypes were shared with modern populations. Allele sharing between the Etruscans and modern populations is highest among Germans (seven haplotypes in common), the Cornish from South West England (five haplotypes in common), the Turks (four haplotypes in common), and the Tuscans (two haplotypes in common).

A couple of mitochondrial DNA studies, published in 2013 in the journals PLOS One and American Journal of Physical Anthropology, based on Etruscan samples from Tuscany and Latium, concluded that the Etruscans were an indigenous population, showing that Etruscan mtDNA appears to fall very close to a Neolithic population from Central Europe (Germany, Austria, Hungary) and to other Tuscan populations, strongly suggesting that the Etruscan civilization developed locally from the Villanovan culture, as already supported by archaeological evidence and anthropological research, and that genetic links between Tuscany and western Anatolia date back to at least 5,000 years ago during the Neolithic and the "most likely separation time between Tuscany and Western Anatolia falls around 7,600 years ago", at the time of the migrations of Early European Farmers (EEF) from Anatolia to Europe in the early Neolithic. The ancient Etruscan samples had mitochondrial DNA haplogroups (mtDNA) JT (subclades of J and T) and U5, with a minority of mtDNA H1b. 

In the collective volume Etruscology published in 2017, British archeologist Phil Perkins provides an analysis of the state of DNA studies and writes that "none of the DNA studies to date conclusively prove that Etruscans were an intrusive population in Italy that originated in the Eastern Mediterranean or Anatolia" and "there are indications that the evidence of DNA can support the theory that Etruscan people are autochthonous in central Italy".

A 2019 genetic study published in the journal Science analyzed the remains of eleven Iron Age individuals from the areas around Rome, of which four were Etruscan individuals, one buried in Veio Grotta Gramiccia from the Villanovan era (900-800 BC) and three buried in La Mattonara Necropolis near Civitavecchia from the Orientalizing period (700-600 BC). The study concluded that Etruscans (900–600 BC) and the Latins (900–500 BC) from Latium vetus were genetically similar, with genetic differences between the examined Etruscans and Latins found to be insignificant. The Etruscan individuals and contemporary Latins were distinguished from preceding populations of Italy by the presence of ca. 30% steppe ancestry. Their DNA was a mixture of two-thirds Copper Age ancestry (EEF + WHG; Etruscans ~66–72%, Latins ~62–75%), and one-third Steppe-related ancestry (Etruscans ~27–33%, Latins ~24–37%). The only sample of Y-DNA extracted belonged to haplogroup J-M12 (J2b-L283), found in an individual dated 700-600 BC, and carried exactly the M314 derived allele also found in a Middle Bronze Age individual from Croatia (1631-1531 calBCE). While the four samples of mtDNA extracted belonged to haplogroups U5a1, H, T2b32, K1a4. Therefore, Etruscans had also Steppe-related ancestry despite speaking a non-Indo-European language.

A 2021 genetic study, published in the journal Science Advances, analyzed the autosomal DNA of 48 Iron Age individuals from Tuscany and Lazio, spanning from 800 to 1 BC, and confirmed that in the Etruscan individuals was present the ancestral component Steppe in the same percentages found in the previously analyzed Iron Age Latins, and in the Etruscan DNA was completely absent a signal of recent admixture with Anatolia and the Eastern Mediterranean, concluding that the Etruscans were autochthonous and they had a genetic profile similar to their Latin neighbors. Both Etruscans and Latins joined firmly the European cluster, west of modern Italians. The Etruscan cluster is a mixture of WHG, EEF, and Steppe ancestry; 75% of the Etruscan male individuals were found to belong to haplogroup R1b, especially R1b-P312 and its derivative R1b-L2 whose direct ancestor is R1b-U152, while the most common mitochondrial DNA haplogroup among the Etruscans was H.

In his 2021 book, A Short History of Humanity, German geneticist Johannes Krause, co-director of the Max Planck Institute for Evolutionary Anthropology in Jena, concludes that it is likely that the Etruscan language (as well as Basque, Paleo-Sardinian, and Minoan) "developed on the continent in the course of the Neolithic Revolution".

Periodization of Etruscan civilization

The Etruscan civilization begins with the Villanovan culture, regarded as the oldest phase. The Etruscans themselves dated the origin of the Etruscan nation to a date corresponding to the 11th or 10th century BC. The Villanovan culture emerges with the phenomenon of regionalization from the late Bronze Age culture called "Proto-Villanovan", part of the central European Urnfield culture system. In the last Villanovan phase, called the recent phase (about 770–730 BC), the Etruscans established relations of a certain consistency with the first Greek immigrants in southern Italy (in Pithecusa and then in Cuma), so much so as to initially absorb techniques and figurative models and soon more properly cultural models, with the introduction, for example, of writing, of a new way of banqueting, of a heroic funerary ideology, that is, a new aristocratic way of life, such as to profoundly change the physiognomy of Etruscan society. Thus, thanks to the growing number of contacts with the Greeks, the Etruscans entered what is called the Orientalizing phase. In this phase, there was a heavy influence in Greece, most of Italy and some areas of Spain, from the most advanced areas of the eastern Mediterranean and the ancient Near East. Also directly Phoenician, or otherwise Near Eastern, craftsmen, merchants and artists contributed to the spread in southern Europe of Near Eastern cultural and artistic motifs. The last three phases of Etruscan civilization are called, respectively, Archaic, Classical and Hellenistic, which roughly correspond to the homonymous phases of the ancient Greek civilization.

Chronology

Expansion

Etruscan expansion was focused both to the north beyond the Apennine Mountains and into Campania. Some small towns in the sixth century BC disappeared during this time, ostensibly subsumed by greater, more powerful neighbours. However, it is certain that the political structure of the Etruscan culture was similar to, albeit more aristocratic than, Magna Graecia in the south. The mining and commerce of metal, especially copper and iron, led to an enrichment of the Etruscans and to the expansion of their influence in the Italian peninsula and the western Mediterranean Sea. Here, their interests collided with those of the Greeks, especially in the sixth century BC, when Phocaeans of Italy founded colonies along the coast of Sardinia, Spain and Corsica. This led the Etruscans to ally themselves with Carthage, whose interests also collided with the Greeks.

Around 540 BC, the Battle of Alalia led to a new distribution of power in the western Mediterranean. Though the battle had no clear winner, Carthage managed to expand its sphere of influence at the expense of the Greeks, and Etruria saw itself relegated to the northern Tyrrhenian Sea with full ownership of Corsica. From the first half of the 5th century BC, the new political situation meant the beginning of the Etruscan decline after losing their southern provinces. In 480 BC, Etruria's ally Carthage was defeated by a coalition of Magna Graecia cities led by Syracuse, Sicily. A few years later, in 474 BC, Syracuse's tyrant Hiero defeated the Etruscans at the Battle of Cumae. Etruria's influence over the cities of Latium and Campania weakened, and the area was taken over by Romans and Samnites.

In the 4th century BC, Etruria saw a Gallic invasion end its influence over the Po Valley and the Adriatic coast. Meanwhile, Rome had started annexing Etruscan cities. This led to the loss of the northern Etruscan provinces. During the Roman–Etruscan Wars, Etruria was conquered by Rome in the 3rd century BC.

Etruscan League

According to legend, there was a period between 600 BC and 500 BC in which an alliance was formed among twelve Etruscan settlements, known today as the Etruscan League, Etruscan Federation, or Dodecapolis (in Greek Δωδεκάπολις). According to a legend the Etruscan League of twelve cities was founded by Tarchon and his brother Tyrrhenus. Tarchon lent his name to the city of Tarchna, or Tarquinnii, as it was known by the Romans. Tyrrhenus gave his name to the Tyrrhenians, the alternative name for the Etruscans. Although there is no consensus on which cities were in the league, the following list may be close to the mark: Arretium, Caisra, Clevsin, Curtun, Perusna, Pupluna, Veii, Tarchna, Vetluna, Volterra, Velzna, and Velch. Some modern authors include Rusellae. The league was mostly an economic and religious league, or a loose confederation, similar to the Greek states. During the later imperial times, when Etruria was just one of many regions controlled by Rome, the number of cities in the league increased by three. This is noted on many later grave stones from the 2nd century BC onwards. According to Livy, the twelve city-states met once a year at the Fanum Voltumnae at Volsinii, where a leader was chosen to represent the league.

There were two other Etruscan leagues ("Lega dei popoli"): that of Campania, the main city of which was Capua, and the Po Valley city-states in northern Italy, which included Bologna, Spina and Adria.

Possible founding of Rome

Those who subscribe to a Latin foundation of Rome followed by an Etruscan invasion typically speak of an Etruscan "influence" on Roman culture – that is, cultural objects which were adopted by Rome from neighbouring Etruria. The prevailing view is that Rome was founded by Latins who later merged with Etruscans. In this interpretation, Etruscan cultural objects are considered influences rather than part of a heritage. Rome was probably a small settlement until the arrival of the Etruscans, who constructed the first elements of its urban infrastructure such as the drainage system.

The main criterion for deciding whether an object originated at Rome and traveled by influence to the Etruscans, or descended to the Romans from the Etruscans, is date. Many, if not most, of the Etruscan cities were older than Rome. If one finds that a given feature was there first, it cannot have originated at Rome. A second criterion is the opinion of the ancient sources. These would indicate that certain institutions and customs came directly from the Etruscans. Rome is located on the edge of what was Etruscan territory. When Etruscan settlements turned up south of the border, it was presumed that the Etruscans spread there after the foundation of Rome, but the settlements are now known to have preceded Rome.

Etruscan settlements were frequently built on hills – the steeper the better – and surrounded by thick walls. According to Roman mythology, when Romulus and Remus founded Rome, they did so on the Palatine Hill according to Etruscan ritual; that is, they began with a pomerium or sacred ditch. Then, they proceeded to the walls. Romulus was required to kill Remus when the latter jumped over the wall, breaking its magic spell (see also under Pons Sublicius). The name of Rome is attested in Etruscan in the form Ruma-χ meaning 'Roman', a form that mirrors other attested ethnonyms in that language with the same suffix -χ: Velzna-χ '(someone) from Volsinii' and Sveama-χ '(someone) from Sovana'. This in itself, however, is not enough to prove Etruscan origin conclusively. If Tiberius is from θefarie, then Ruma would have been placed on the Thefar (Tiber) river. A heavily discussed topic among scholars is who was the founding population of Rome. In 390 BC, the city of Rome was attacked by the Gauls, and as a result may have lost many – though not all – of its earlier records.

Later history relates that some Etruscans lived in the Vicus Tuscus, the "Etruscan quarter", and that there was an Etruscan line of kings (albeit ones descended from a Greek, Demaratus of Corinth) that succeeded kings of Latin and Sabine origin. Etruscophile historians would argue that this, together with evidence for institutions, religious elements and other cultural elements, proves that Rome was founded by Etruscans. The true picture is rather more complicated, not least because the Etruscan cities were separate entities which never came together to form a single Etruscan state. Furthermore, there were strong Latin and Italic elements to Roman culture, and later Romans proudly celebrated these multiple, 'multicultural' influences on the city.

Under Romulus and Numa Pompilius, the people were said to have been divided into thirty curiae and three tribes. Few Etruscan words entered Latin, but the names of at least two of the tribes – Ramnes and Luceres – seem to be Etruscan. The last kings may have borne the Etruscan title lucumo, while the regalia were traditionally considered of Etruscan origin – the golden crown, the sceptre, the toga palmata (a special robe), the sella curulis (curule chair), and above all the primary symbol of state power: the fasces. The latter was a bundle of whipping rods surrounding a double-bladed axe, carried by the king's lictors. An example of the fasces are the remains of bronze rods and the axe from a tomb in Etruscan Vetulonia. This allowed archaeologists to identify the depiction of a fasces on the grave stele of Avele Feluske, who is shown as a warrior wielding the fasces. The most telling Etruscan feature is the word populus, which appears as an Etruscan deity, Fufluns.

Roman families of Etruscan origin

Society

Government

The historical Etruscans had achieved a state system of society, with remnants of the chiefdom and tribal forms. Rome was in a sense the first Italic state, but it began as an Etruscan one. It is believed that the Etruscan government style changed from total monarchy to oligarchic republic (as the Roman Republic) in the 6th century BC.

The government was viewed as being a central authority, ruling over all tribal and clan organizations. It retained the power of life and death; in fact, the gorgon, an ancient symbol of that power, appears as a motif in Etruscan decoration. The adherents to this state power were united by a common religion. The people were the mech.

Family

The princely tombs were not of individuals. The inscription evidence shows that families were interred there over long periods, marking the growth of the aristocratic family as a fixed institution, parallel to the gens at Rome and perhaps even its model. The Etruscans could have used any model of the eastern Mediterranean. That the growth of this class is related to the new acquisition of wealth through trade is unquestioned. The wealthiest cities were located near the coast. At the centre of the society was the married couple, tusurthir. The Etruscans were a monogamous society that emphasized pairing.

Similarly, the behaviour of some wealthy women is not uniquely Etruscan. The apparent promiscuous revelry has a spiritual explanation. Swaddling and Bonfante (among others) explain that depictions of the nude embrace, or symplegma, "had the power to ward off evil", as did baring the breast, which was adopted by western culture as an apotropaic device, appearing finally on the figureheads of sailing ships as a nude female upper torso. It is also possible that Greek and Roman attitudes to the Etruscans were based on a misunderstanding of the place of women within their society. In both Greece and the earliest Republican Rome, respectable women were confined to the house and mixed-sex socialising did not occur. Thus, the freedom of women within Etruscan society could have been misunderstood as implying their sexual availability. It is worth noting that a number of Etruscan tombs carry funerary inscriptions in the form "X son of (father) and (mother)", indicating the importance of the mother's side of the family.

Military

The Etruscans, like the contemporary cultures of Ancient Greece and Ancient Rome, had a significant military tradition. In addition to marking the rank and power of certain individuals, warfare was a considerable economic advantage to Etruscan civilization. Like many ancient societies, the Etruscans conducted campaigns during summer months, raiding neighboring areas, attempting to gain territory and combating piracy as a means of acquiring valuable resources, such as land, prestige, goods, and slaves. It is likely that individuals taken in battle would be ransomed back to their families and clans at high cost. Prisoners could also potentially be sacrificed on tombs as an honor to fallen leaders of Etruscan society, not unlike the sacrifices made by Achilles for Patrocles.

Cities 

The range of Etruscan civilization is marked by its cities. They were entirely assimilated by Italic, Celtic, or Roman ethnic groups, but the names survive from inscriptions and their ruins are of aesthetic and historic interest in most of the cities of central Italy. Etruscan cities flourished over most of Italy during the Roman Iron Age, marking the farthest extent of Etruscan civilization. They were gradually assimilated first by Italics in the south, then by Celts in the north and finally in Etruria itself by the growing Roman Republic.

That many Roman cities were formerly Etruscan was well known to all the Roman authors. Some cities were founded by Etruscans in prehistoric times, and bore entirely Etruscan names. Others were colonized by Etruscans who Etruscanized the name, usually Italic.

Culture

Religion

The Etruscan system of belief was an immanent polytheism; that is, all visible phenomena were considered to be a manifestation of divine power and that power was subdivided into deities that acted continually on the world of man and could be dissuaded or persuaded in favour of human affairs. How to understand the will of deities, and how to behave, had been revealed to the Etruscans by two initiators, Tages, a childlike figure born from tilled land and immediately gifted with prescience, and Vegoia, a female figure. Their teachings were kept in a series of sacred books. Three layers of deities are evident in the extensive Etruscan art motifs. One appears to be divinities of an indigenous nature: Catha and Usil, the sun; Tivr, the moon; Selvans, a civil god; Turan, the goddess of love; Laran, the god of war; Leinth, the goddess of death; Maris; Thalna; Turms; and the ever-popular Fufluns, whose name is related in some way to the city of Populonia and the populus Romanus, possibly, the god of the people.

Ruling over this pantheon of lesser deities were higher ones that seem to reflect the Indo-European system: Tin or Tinia, the sky, Uni his wife (Juno), and Cel, the earth goddess. In addition, some Greek and Roman gods were taken into the Etruscan system: Aritimi (Artemis), Menrva (Minerva), Pacha (Dionysus). The Greek heroes taken from Homer also appear extensively in art motifs.

Architecture

Relatively little is known about the architecture of the ancient Etruscans. They adapted the native Italic styles with influence from the external appearance of Greek architecture. In turn, ancient Roman architecture began with Etruscan styles, and then accepted still further Greek influence. Roman temples show many of the same differences in form to Greek ones that Etruscan temples do, but like the Greeks, use stone, in which they closely copy Greek conventions. The houses of the wealthy were evidently often large and comfortable, but the burial chambers of tombs, often filled with grave-goods, are the nearest approach to them to survive. In the southern Etruscan area, tombs have large rock-cut chambers under a tumulus in large necropoleis, and these, together with some city walls, are the only Etruscan constructions to survive. Etruscan architecture is not generally considered as part of the body of Greco-Roman classical architecture.

Art and music 

Etruscan art was produced by the Etruscan civilization between the 9th and 2nd centuries BC. Particularly strong in this tradition were figurative sculpture in terracotta (particularly lifesize on sarcophagi or temples), wall-painting and metalworking (especially engraved bronze mirrors). Etruscan sculpture in cast bronze was famous and widely exported, but few large examples have survived (the material was too valuable, and recycled later). In contrast to terracotta and bronze, there was apparently little Etruscan sculpture in stone, despite the Etruscans controlling fine sources of marble, including Carrara marble, which seems not to have been exploited until the Romans. Most surviving Etruscan art comes from tombs, including all the fresco wall-paintings, a minority of which show scenes of feasting and some narrative mythological subjects.

Bucchero wares in black were the early and native styles of fine Etruscan pottery. There was also a tradition of elaborate Etruscan vase painting, which sprung from its Greek equivalent; the Etruscans were the main export market for Greek vases. Etruscan temples were heavily decorated with colourfully painted terracotta antefixes and other fittings, which survive in large numbers where the wooden superstructure has vanished. Etruscan art was strongly connected to religion; the afterlife was of major importance in Etruscan art.

The Etruscan musical instruments seen in frescoes and bas-reliefs are different types of pipes, such as the plagiaulos (the pipes of Pan or Syrinx), the alabaster pipe and the famous double pipes, accompanied on percussion instruments such as the tintinnabulum, tympanum and crotales, and later by stringed instruments like the lyre and kithara.

Language

Etruscans left around 13,000 inscriptions which have been found so far, only a small minority of which are of significant length. Attested from 700 BC to AD 50, the relation of Etruscan to other languages has been a source of long-running speculation and study. The Etruscans are believed to have spoken a Pre-Indo-European and Paleo-European language, and the majority consensus is that Etruscan is related only to other members of what is called the Tyrsenian language family, which in itself is an isolate family, that is unrelated directly to other known language groups. Since Rix (1998), it is widely accepted that the Tyrsenian family groups Raetic and Lemnian are related to Etruscan.

Literature

Etruscan texts, written in a space of seven centuries, use a form of the Greek alphabet due to close contact between the Etruscans and the Greek colonies at Pithecusae and Cumae in the 8th century BC (until it was no longer used, at the beginning of the 1st century AD). Etruscan inscriptions disappeared from Chiusi, Perugia and Arezzo around this time. Only a few fragments survive, religious and especially funeral texts most of which are late (from the 4th century BC). In addition to the original texts that have survived to this day, there are a large number of quotations and allusions from classical authors. In the 1st century BC, Diodorus Siculus wrote that literary culture was one of the great achievements of the Etruscans. Little is known of it and even what is known of their language is due to the repetition of the same few words in the many inscriptions found (by way of the modern epitaphs) contrasted in bilingual or trilingual texts with Latin and Punic. Out of the aforementioned genres, is just one such Volnio (Volnius) cited in classical sources mention. With a few exceptions, such as the Liber Linteus, the only written records in the Etruscan language that remain are inscriptions, mainly funerary. The language is written in the Etruscan alphabet, a script related to the early Euboean Greek alphabet. Many thousand inscriptions in Etruscan are known, mostly epitaphs, and a few very short texts have survived, which are mainly religious. Etruscan imaginative literature is evidenced only in references by later Roman authors, but it is evident from their visual art that the Greek myths were well-known.

References

Sources

Further reading
 Bartoloni, Gilda (ed). Introduzione all'Etruscologia (in Italian). Milan: Hoepli, 2012.
 Sinclair Bell and Carpino A. Alexandra (eds). A Companion to the Etruscans, Oxford; Chichester; Malden, MA:  Wiley Blackwell, 2016.
 Bonfante, Giuliano and Bonfante Larissa. The Etruscan Language: An Introduction. Manchester: Manchester University Press, 2002.
 Bonfante, Larissa. Out of Etruria: Etruscan Influence North and South. Oxford: B.A.R., 1981.
 Bonfante, Larissa. Etruscan Life and Afterlife: A Handbook of Etruscan Studies. Detroit: Wayne State University Press, 1986.
 Bonfante, Larissa. Etruscan Myths. London: British Museum Press, 2006.
 Briquel, Dominique. Les Étrusques, peuple de la différence, series Civilisations U, éditions Armand Colin, Paris, 1993.
 Briquel, Dominique. La civilisation étrusque, éditions Fayard, Paris, 1999.
 De Grummond, Nancy T. (2014). Ethnicity and the Etruscans. In McInerney, Jeremy (ed.). A Companion to Ethnicity in the Ancient Mediterranean. Chichester, UK: John Wiley & Sons, Inc. pp. 405–422.
 Haynes, Sybille. Etruscan Civilization: A Cultural History. Los Angeles: J. Paul Getty Museum, 2000.
 Izzet, Vedia. The Archaeology of Etruscan Society. New York: Cambridge University Press, 2007.
 Naso, Alessandro (ed). Etruscology, Berlin, Boston: De Gruyter, 2017.
 Pallottino, Massimo. Etruscologia. Milan: Hoepli, 1942 (English ed., The Etruscans. David Ridgway, editor. Bloomington, IN: Indiana University Press, 1975).
 Shipley, Lucy. The Etruscans: Lost Civilizations, London: Reaktion Books, 2017.
 Smith, C. The Etruscans: a very short introduction , Oxford: Oxford University Press, 2014.
 Spivey, Nigel. Etruscan Art. New York: Thames and Hudson, 1997.
 Swaddling, Judith and Philip Perkins. Etruscan by Definition: The Culture, Regional, and Personal Identity of the Etruscans: Papers in Honor of Sybille Haynes. London: British Museum, 2009.
 * Torelli, M. (ed.) (2001) The Etruscans. London.
 Turfa, Jean MacIntosh (ed). The Etruscan World. London: Routledge, 2013.
 Turfa, Jean MacIntosh. The Etruscans. In Farney, Gary D.; Bradley, Gary (eds.). The Peoples of Ancient Italy. Berlin: De Gruyter. pp. 637–672.

Cities and sites
 (Soprintendenza per i Beni Archeologici dell'Umbria) "The Cai Cutu Etruscan tomb" An undisturbed late Etruscan family tomb, reused between the 3rd and 1st century BC, reassembled in the National Archeological Museum of Perugia
 Hypogeum of the Volumnis digital media archive (creative commons-licensed photos, laser scans, panoramas), data from a University of Ferrara/CyArk research partnership

External links

 
 
 

 
Archaeological cultures in Italy
Ancient peoples of Italy
9th-century BC establishments in Italy
States and territories established in the 9th century BC
States and territories disestablished in the 1st century BC
Former confederations